Abdul Hameed Mohamed Azwer (8 February 1937 – 29 August 2017) was a Sri Lankan politician and a Member of the Parliament of Sri Lanka. He was of the Sri Lanka Freedom Party which nominated him on its national list to the Parliament of Sri Lanka.

References

 Sri Lanka Parliament profile

1937 births
2017 deaths
Alumni of Zahira College, Colombo
Lanka Sama Samaja Party politicians
Members of the 9th Parliament of Sri Lanka
Members of the 14th Parliament of Sri Lanka
Ministers of state of Sri Lanka
Parliamentary affairs ministers of Sri Lanka
Place of birth missing
Sri Lanka Freedom Party politicians
Sri Lankan Moor journalists
Sri Lankan Moor politicians
Sri Lankan Moor teachers
Sri Lankan Muslims
United National Party politicians
United People's Freedom Alliance politicians